Santa Bárbara  (Portuguese for Saint Barbara) is a parish in the municipality of Ribeira Grande in the Azores. The population in 2011 was 1,275, in an area of 12.84 km². It contains the localities Chavinha, Courela, Diogo and Santa Bárbara.

References

Parishes of Ribeira Grande, Azores